Kylie Jameson (born 9 September 1976) is a New Zealand sailor. She competed at the 2004 Summer Olympics in Athens, in the Yngling class.

References

External links

1976 births
Living people
New Zealand female sailors (sport)
Olympic sailors of New Zealand
Sailors at the 2004 Summer Olympics – Yngling